Hijum is a village in Leeuwarden municipality in the province of Friesland, the Netherlands. It had a population of around 385 in January 2017.

History
It was first mentioned in 1431 as Hehem. The name could mean "the settlement of Haie (person)". Hijum is a terp (artificial living mound) village with a radial structure which developed near the Middelzee. Around 1900, the terp except for the church was excavated. The Dutch Reformed church and tower were built in the 12th century, and were restored in 1976.

In 1840, Hijum was home to 310 people. Hijum used to have a railway station between 1901 and 1940.

Before 2018, the village was part of the Leeuwarderadeel municipality.

Gallery

References

External links

Leeuwarden
Populated places in Friesland